Oktaha is a town in Muskogee County, Oklahoma, United States.

History
Oktaha was named for a Muscogee chief, Oktarharsars Harjo (also known as Sands). The town originated in 1872 as a stop on the MK&T "Katy" Railroad. By 1900, the town had its own post office; a small business district emerged as well. Local business lagged, however, by mid-century, and the town struggled even more when U.S. Highway 69 was rerouted to bypass Oktaha. Nevertheless, Oktaha remains the site of a K-12 school that draws several hundred students from rural portions of Muskogee County.

Geography
Oktaha is located at  (35.577772, −95.476762).

Census
The population was 390 at the 2010 census, a 19.3 percent increase over the figure of 327 recorded in 2000.

Demographics

As of the census of 2000, there were 327 people, 110 households, and 91 families residing in the town. There were 127 housing units at an average density of 487.9 per square mile (188.6/km2). The racial makeup of the town was 70.95% White, 3.36% African American, 16.82% Native American, 0.61% Asian, 0.31% from other races, and 7.95% from two or more races. Hispanic or Latino of any race were 0.31% of the population.

There were 110 households, out of which 41.8% had children under the age of 18 living with them, 60.0% were married couples living together, 19.1% had a female householder with no husband present, and 16.4% were non-families. 13.6% of all households were made up of individuals, and 5.5% had someone living alone who was 65 years of age or older. The average household size was 2.97 and the average family size was 3.25.

In the town, the population was spread out, with 31.5% under the age of 18, 8.9% from 18 to 24, 30.0% from 25 to 44, 18.3% from 45 to 64, and 11.3% who were 65 years of age or older. The median age was 32 years. For every 100 females, there were 95.8 males. For every 100 females age 18 and over, there were 83.6 males.

The median income for a household in the town was $24,844, and the median income for a family was $30,556. Males had a median income of $23,958 versus $21,250 for females. The per capita income for the town was $11,174. About 18.5% of families and 19.1% of the population were below the poverty line, including 24.1% of those under age 18 and none of those age 65 or over.

Notable people
 The noted Native American sculptor Willard Stone was born in Oktaha in 1916.
 Ted Yochum, rodeo performer.

Footnotes

Towns in Muskogee County, Oklahoma
Towns in Oklahoma
1872 establishments in Indian Territory